Bob Lee "the Nailer" Swagger is a fictional character created by Stephen Hunter. He is the protagonist of a series of 12 novels (as of 2022) that relate his life during and after the Vietnam War—starting with Point of Impact (1993) up to the most recent Targeted (2022). Swagger is also the protagonist of both the 2007 film and the 2016 TV series Shooter, each based on Point of Impact.  Creator Stephen Hunter has stated that Swagger is loosely based on USMC Scout Sniper Carlos Hathcock.

Fictional character biography
Bob Lee Swagger is a retired Marine Gunnery Sergeant who was born in 1946 and raised in Blue Eye (a fictionalized version of Mena, Arkansas) in Polk County, Arkansas. He is the son of Arkansas State Trooper Earl Swagger, a retired Marine First Sergeant and Medal of Honor recipient, and June Swagger. Bob Lee's father dies in 1955, but not before imparting an appreciation for firearms in his son, harnessing the natural Swagger gift for firearms.

Swagger joins the Marines, forging a successful career as a Marine Sniper. Bob Lee served three tours in Vietnam, working with Special Operations, and earned the nickname 'Bob the Nailer' for his uncanny ability with a rifle. Despite official counts crediting him with 87 combat kills, in reality he has killed a total of 391 men, with his most notable success being an engagement when a battalion of the North Vietnamese Army were closing on a lightly defended Special Forces Base.  Bob Lee and his spotter, Lance Corporal Donny Fenn, succeeded in delaying the battalion for two days until air support could arrive, and during the engagement Bob Lee killed in excess of 80 enemy troops, only stopping when his ammunition ran out.

While serving in Vietnam, Swagger was shot in the hip from a distance of 1400 meters by T. Solaratov, a Soviet sniper who also killed Fenn soon after with a shot to the chest from the same distance.

Bob Lee was retired by the Marine Corps in 1975, suffering from a permanent disability due to the hip wound. He became an alcoholic to numb his depression, which resulted in the break-up of his second marriage to Susan, and he retreated to a hermitic existence on family land near Blue Eye.

The events of Point of Impact begin at this stage of his life (1992) when he is approached by a clandestine organization to prevent the assassination of the President by a highly trained sniper, whom he is told is the same sniper who shot him and killed his spotter Donny. Bob Lee later finds himself framed as the "lone gunman". With the help of Nick Memphis, an FBI agent assigned to the case, and attorney Sam Vincent, an old friend of Earl Swagger, Bob Lee manages to clear his name and destroy the people who set him up.

He goes on to marry Julie Fenn, the widow of his spotter, and they have a daughter, Nikki Swagger. In Black Light, Swagger unravels a conspiracy behind the murder of his father.

In Time to Hunt, Swagger solves the mystery of his spotter's death, which culminates in a duel with Solaratov. This novel also depicts a portion of Bob Lee's service in the Vietnam War.

The fourth Bob Lee Swagger novel, The 47th Samurai, was published on September 11, 2007. In this novel, Bob Lee travels to Japan to return a samurai sword recovered by his father in World War II to its rightful owner, but quickly finds himself wrapped up in yet another deadly plot. This novel reveals the story of Earl's tour of duty on Iwo Jima.

The fifth novel, Night of Thunder, was published in 2008.  In this novel Swagger, at 63 yrs old, is trying to find out who ran his 24-year-old daughter Nikki off the road in an attempt on her life.  Set in NASCAR country and centered around the big race at Bristol, the Grumleys from Hunter's Hot Springs re-appear in this novel.  Once again Swagger finds himself hunting the hunters and at his advanced age is still shooting straight and fast. He makes his way through Malvern and Sheridan.

The sixth novel, I, Sniper, was published in 2009. In this novel, the FBI enlists Bob Lee's help in investigating the murders of several prominent 1960s Vietnam War protesters. Although the evidence initially points to former Marine sniper Carl Hitchcock (based on Carlos Hathcock), Bob Lee quickly discovers that Hitchcock was framed for the murders and sets out to find the real killer.  His investigation takes him into the world of modern military sniper warfare, which technology has altered greatly since his days in Vietnam.

The seventh Bob Lee Swagger novel, Dead Zero, released December 28, 2010, and is set in the current Global War on Terrorism. A Marine sniper named Ray Cruz, on an assassination mission, is betrayed, and in the time after, the target, Ibrahim Zarzi, also known as "the beheader", becomes a prospective Afghan presidential candidate. Zarzi professes loyalty to the U.S. after attempts on his life, but Cruz resurfaces to complete the mission. Bob Lee Swagger is brought in as a consultant by request of Assistant Director Nick Memphis, friendly with Swagger since the events of Point of Impact, and Central Intelligence Agency (CIA) agent Susan Okada, of The 47th Samurai. Swagger is asked to help find Cruz, but along the way becomes sympathetic of Cruz and doubts his guilt. Later it is revealed that Cruz is Swagger's son, byproduct of a previously unknown marriage to a Vietnamese woman who was killed during the Tet Offensive. The loss of his wife and disappearance of the baby, it is theorized, motivated Swagger to take a third tour of duty, this time as a sniper, and establishing his legend.

In Dead Zero, Swagger moves from  action hero to detective and strategist. Other elements in Dead Zero new to the Bob Lee Swagger novels are the inclusion of private security contractors and their presence in Operation Enduring Freedom in Afghanistan. One of the plot elements is a three-man team referred to as "unidentified contractor team". They use the Barrett M82 sniper rifle, which was originally introduced in Night of Thunder by its Army designation, the Barrett M107. Other devices new in this series are a miniature transponder called an "active RFID" or RFID tag. The use of "drones" (remote controlled unmanned aerial vehicles) is also new in this novel, and on the final page of the novel, Swagger is figuratively seen as using a drone for a sniper kill. The term "dead zero" in sniper and precision shooting usage refers to the desirable state of affairs where after several trial shots (called "ranging shots") the horizontal part of the cross-hair on the reticle has been adjusted for the distance and elevation of the target, and the vertical part of the cross-hair has been adjusted for windage, and so the crossing of the two in the field of view of the shooter corresponds to the anticipated point of impact. The cross-hairs meet on the target just as one sees on movie and TV use of telescopic sights.

In The Third Bullet, the eighth Bob Swagger novel, Bob Lee attempts to unravel the mystery behind the Kennedy assassination from a sniper's point of view and utilizes his unique skill-set to question several actual details from the Warren Commission, etc.

In Sniper's Honor, the ninth Bob Swagger novel, Bob Lee teams with a newspaper reporter to uncover the fate of a World War II female Russian sniper known as the White Witch. Also unearthed is a plot to attack Israel with newly manufactured Zyklon B poison gas. The story jumps between 1944 and present day, with most of it set in Ukraine. Bob Lee once again takes on the role of shooter as well as detective.

G Man, released in 2017, is the tenth novel in the series. It concerns a 71 year old Swagger attempting to uncover the history of his grandfather Charles Fitzgerald Swagger. Charles was a veteran of both the Canadian and U.S. armies during World War I retiring as a United States Army Major and returned to become the Sheriff of Polk County Arkansas. Bob and Nick Memphis uncover his secret work as an FBI agent during which he was involved in hunting down several famous bank robbers in the year 1934 as well as his downfall from success.

Other books in the Bob Lee Swagger series:

Game of Snipers-2019

Targeted-2021

Books related to Bob Lee Swagger Series

The Bullet Garden: An Earl Swagger Novel

Shooter (adaptations)
Point of Impact is the basis for the movie Shooter, starring Mark Wahlberg as Swagger. The film takes place in present day, with many of the circumstances updated to a contemporary setting.

A TV adaptation also entitled Shooter aired for three seasons, from 2016 to 2018. Ryan Phillippe stars as Swagger.

See also

References

External links

Action film characters
Action television characters
Characters in American novels of the 20th century
Fictional American military snipers
Fictional characters from Arkansas
Literary characters introduced in 1993
Fictional gunnery sergeants
Fictional MCMAP practitioners
Fictional Medal of Honor recipients
Fictional murderers
Fictional United States Marine Corps Force Reconnaissance personnel
Fictional Vietnam War veterans
Fictional vigilantes